Ricardo Costa de Oliveira (born 14 June 1982) is a visually impaired athlete from Brazil who competes in the long jump and 100 m sprint. He won a gold medal in the long jump (F11 class) at the 2016 Summer Paralympics. His sister Silvânia Costa de Oliveira also won the gold medal in the women's long jump T11 event at the 2016 Summer Paralympics.

References

External links

 

1982 births
Living people
Brazilian male long jumpers
Brazilian male sprinters
Paralympic athletes of Brazil
Paralympic gold medalists for Brazil
Paralympic gold medalists in athletics (track and field)
Athletes (track and field) at the 2016 Summer Paralympics
Athletes (track and field) at the 2020 Summer Paralympics
Medalists at the 2016 Summer Paralympics
People from Três Lagoas
Sportspeople from Mato Grosso do Sul
20th-century Brazilian people
21st-century Brazilian people